Jesus "Jesse" Ernesto Pintado Andrade (July 12, 1969 – August 27, 2006) was a Mexican-American guitarist best known as the lead guitarist for the British grindcore band Napalm Death. He started in the grindcore band Terrorizer where he recorded the album World Downfall, the first album to feature Pete Sandoval who would later leave the band to join Morbid Angel.

Pintado was born in Mexico and moved to the US at an early age. He lived in Huntington Park, California but moved to Birmingham, England after he joined Napalm Death, where he replaced guitarist Bill Steer immediately prior to the recording of their album Harmony Corruption.

In 2004 he officially left Napalm Death; instead of replacing him, the band has since continued as a four-piece. Pintado later revived Terrorizer, recruiting Tony Norman of Monstrosity and Anthony Rezhawk of Resistant Culture; he and Pete Sandoval were the only original members.

Besides Terrorizer and Napalm Death he also played in Lock Up and Brujeria. Both bands also featured Napalm Death bass player Shane Embury.

Pintado died at Erasmus MC hospital in Rotterdam, Netherlands, of liver failure.


Discography

Napalm Death

Studio albums 
Harmony Corruption (1990)
Utopia Banished (1992)
Fear, Emptiness, Despair (1994)
Diatribes (1996)
Inside the Torn Apart (1997)
Words from the Exit Wound (1998)
Enemy of the Music Business (2000)

Pintado was also credited for Order of the Leech and Leaders Not Followers: Part 2, however, he did not actually appear on these records.

Singles and EPs 
 Harmony Corruption bonus live EP (EP, 1990)
 Mass Appeal Madness (EP, MOSH46 1991)
 The World Keeps Turning (EP, MOSH65 1992)
 Nazi Punks Fuck Off (EP, MOSH92 1993)
 Hung (EP, 1994)
 More Than Meets the Eye (Promo, 1994)
 Plague Rages (Promo, 1994)
 Greed Killing (EP, 1995)
 Cursed to Tour (split with At the Gates, 1996)
 In Tongues We Speak (split-CD with Coalesce) (MOSH168 1997)
 Breed to Breathe (EP, 1997)
 Leaders Not Followers (EP, 1999)

Napalm Death-only compilation albums 
 Death by Manipulation (MOSH51, Earache 1992)
 The Peel Sessions (1993)
 The Complete Radio One Sessions (2000)
 Noise for Music's Sake (MOSH266, Earache 2003)

Live albums 
 The Peel Sessions (1989)
 Live Corruption (1990)
 Bootlegged in Japan (1998)
 Punishment in Capitals (2002, CD)

DVDs and VHS 
 Live Corruption (VHS, 1991)
 The DVD (DVD, 2001)
 Punishment in Capitals (DVD, 2002)

Terrorizer

Studio albums 
World Downfall (1989)
Darker Days Ahead (2006)

Compilation albums 
From the Tomb (2003)
Before the Downfall (2014)

Nausea LA

Single 
"Psychological Conflict" (1991)

Pintado was credited as songwriting (assistant)

Lock Up

Studio albums 
Pleasures Pave Sewers (CD, 1999)
Hate Breeds Suffering (CD, 2002)

Resistant Culture

Studio albums 
Welcome To Reality (CD, 2005)

Live albums 
Live in Japan (CD, 2005)

Brujeria

Studio album 
Brujerizmo (CD, 2000)

Compilation albums 
Mextremist! Greatest Hits (Kool Arrow Records, 2001)
The Mexecutioner! - The Best of Brujeria (Roadrunner Records, 2003)
The Singles (2006)

References

External links 
Terrorizer MySpace with memorial to Jesse
Jesse Pintado at Encyclopaedia Metallum

1969 births
2006 deaths
American heavy metal guitarists
Death metal musicians
Deaths from liver failure
Mexican emigrants to the United States
Mexican emigrants to the United Kingdom
Napalm Death members
Musicians from Sonora
Deaths from diabetes
Alcohol-related deaths in the Netherlands
20th-century American guitarists
American male guitarists
Terrorizer members
Lock Up (British band) members
Brujeria (band) members
20th-century American male musicians
People from Empalme, Sonora
Grindcore musicians